Brahim Kerrit (2 October 1940 – 22 April 2012) was a Tunisian footballer. He participated in the 1960 Summer Olympics in Rome and scored two goals. He played professional football for Stade Malherbe Caen in France. He was born in El Kef.

References

External links
Biography

Further reading

1940 births
2012 deaths
Tunisian footballers
Association football midfielders
Tunisia international footballers
Olympic footballers of Tunisia
Footballers at the 1960 Summer Olympics
Ligue 1 players
Stade Tunisien players
Stade Malherbe Caen players
CS Hammam-Lif players